These are the albums that reached number one on the Billboard Dance/Electronic Albums chart in 2003.

Chart history

References

United States Electronic Albums
2003